Lawnball is the fifth studio album by American accordion band Those Darn Accordions, released on July 20, 2004, by Globe Records.

Overview
Following the 2002 EP Amped, Lawnball marked the first TDA studio album to feature a reduced six-piece line-up following the departures of original members Linda "Big Lou" Seekins, Patty Brady, Art Peterson and Clyde Forsman. With Paul Rogers now the sole singer-songwriter of the band, Lawnball had a noticeably different musical style than TDA's previous albums, placing a primary emphasis on rock and pop songs with folk, country and jazz influences, while the prominence of the accordions were slightly downplayed and accompaniment from acoustic guitars and pianos added for a fuller studio sound.

The title of the album refers to what's also known as a yard globe, a reflective lawn ornament.

Track listing

Personnel
Those Darn Accordions
Paul Rogers - accordion, vocals, piano, acoustic guitar
Suzanne Garramone - accordion, vocals
Susie Davis - accordion, vocals, vocal arrangements
Carri Abrahms - accordion, vocals
Bill Schwartz - drums, percussion, vocals
Lewis Wallace - electric bass

Additional musicians
Adam Gabriel - dobro, banjo
Joel Jaffe - percussion (track 6)
Nik Phelps - trumpet
Jim Rothermel - clarinet

2004 albums
Those Darn Accordions albums